William Bingham (1808 – September 15, 1873), served as Mayor of Pittsburgh from 1856 to 1857.

William Bingham was born in 1808 and for most of his life was involved in the transportation business. The Bingham Brothers Company was a prosperous firm in the freight delivery industry. The Republican Party was formed in Pittsburgh during Bingham's administration.

Bingham died in 1873.

See also

List of Mayors of Pittsburgh

References
South Pittsburgh Development Corporation
Political Graveyard

1808 births
1873 deaths
Mayors of Pittsburgh
Pennsylvania Know Nothings
Burials at Allegheny Cemetery